Kamalolmolk is a 1984 Iranian film written and directed by Ali Hatami about the life and work of famous Iranian painter Mohammad Ghaffari, better known as Kamal-ol-molk.

The movie focuses greatly on the painter's relationship with the various monarchs of Iran. The cast includes some of the most famous Iranian actors including Jamshid Mashayekhi as the painter himself, and Ezzatollah Entezami as Nasser al-Din Shah. This was also the film debut of the actress Leila Hatami.

Cast 
 Jamshid Mashayekhi
 Ezzatolah Entezami
 Ezzatolah Entezami
 Ali Nassirian
 Davoud Rashidi
 Mohammad-Ali Keshavarz
 Parviz Poorhosseini
 Leila Hatami
 Manouchehr Hamedi
 Jahangir Forouhar
 Siroos Ebrahimzadeh

References

External links

Iranian historical drama films
1984 films
1980s Persian-language films
Films directed by Ali Hatami